The Diversion, published in 2001 and written by K. A. Applegate, is the 49th book in the Animorphs series. It is known to have been ghostwritten by Lisa Harkrader. It is the final book (fully) narrated by Tobias.

Plot summary
The Yeerks begin to realize the "Andalite bandits" are humans. The Animorphs discover the Yeerks have been testing the DNA patterns in the blood they have left in their countless battles. When they discover the traces of human DNA they begin running massive numbers of tests on blood which has been stored in the area in order to discover a genetic match or root out the Animorphs' families. Using this process, a genetic match between Tobias and his mother, Loren, is discovered and gives the Yeerks proof that at least some of the "Andalite bandits" are, in fact, human. They go through a brutal battle at the laboratory where they discover this information in which Marco is nearly killed. After they retreat to Cassie's barn, Jake orders that they all go home and "sleep on it."  The Animorphs will meet in the morning to decide whether or not to evacuate their families, thereby revealing their identities and taking the fight into the open.  This decision, however, later proves very costly for Jake.

Tobias does not return to his meadow but goes to the address the blood databank gave for his mother. He is crestfallen to discover that it is only a few blocks from the house in which he lived with his uncle, yet his mother never once came to visit him or showed any interest in her son at all. Tobias easily spots that she is already being watched by the Yeerks. He observes Loren leaving the house with a seeing-eye dog and quickly realizes that Loren is blind. With the guide dog, Champ, she walks to a church where she apparently volunteers as a crisis phone line operator, and Tobias follows her.

In the morning, the Animorphs unanimously vote to immediately evacuate their families. Through somewhat comical sequences of events, Cassie and Rachel reveal to their families the truth of the invasion and evacuate them to the Hork-Bajir valley. Marco helps with evacuating Cassie's mother and father, and Ax helps with evacuating Rachel's mother and sisters. Jake then tries to evacuate his parents, as well, with Tobias and Ax's help, the plan being to subdue Tom and starve the Yeerk out of him, at long last freeing Jake's brother.  But they appear to be out of the house when the Animorphs arrive.  In fact, Tom's Yeerk has already had Jake's parents infested, and they spring a trap for the waiting Animorphs.  They escape, and Jake morphs falcon in front of the Yeerks, because he wants to show that he has been fighting all along to inspire fear in the Yeerks and hope in his family that he will rescue them.  Still, after their escape, Jake vents to Tobias and Ax that he regrets telling the rest of the team to sleep on their decision, as he could've saved his parents and Tom by at least evacuating them the night before.  After Ax promises Jake that they will eventually rescue his family "when the time is right," Tobias breaks off from them to go visit Loren again.

Tobias morphs his mother's guide dog and spends the night at his mother's house. In the morning, he finally meets Loren, whom he discovers had lost her memory in an accident years before (an event that Tobias knows was manipulated by the Ellimist).  But she knew she did have a son, and hoped that he was happy.  Tobias laments the fact that he never knew her, and tells her he needed a mother.  Tobias then returns to the Hork-Bajir valley and hatches a scheme to help Loren escape by giving her the morphing power.  Jake is resistant to the plan, at first, but ultimately relents, though he does so under the condition that he recruits Rachel and Marco to the plan.

Tobias returns to Loren's house two days later (to make certain that Loren has not already been infested with a Yeerk) with Rachel and Marco's help, and he gives Loren the morphing cube, which grants her the morphing power.  She acquires Tobias's DNA, morphs him in hawk form, and they embark on a desperate escape, which leads to another battle that they barely escape.  During it, Tobias is nearly killed by a Dracon beam, but Loren puts herself in its path to keep him safe from it, nearly dying in the process.  To avoid dying from her injuries, Tobias persuades Loren to demorph, but she is reluctant to do so, as she does not wish to be blind again.  However, after convincing her that all of her prior injuries, including her blindness, would also be healed, she ultimately demorphs and is indeed able to see, with every injury from her accident indeed healed.  They then complete the battle and escape the Yeerks.

Loren is then evacuated to the Hork-Bajir valley. The morphing ability has restored Loren's vision, but not her memories. Tobias still longs for his mother's love and affection, which she displays for her beloved guide dog, but not for him.  However, Tobias remembers that she did throw herself in front of danger to protect him.  Later, he concludes the book by assuring Jake that they will rescue his parents.  They still have the chance as long as they are alive, as it is clear that Visser One is keeping them that way to lure Jake in.

Contributions to the series' story arc
Cassie and Rachel reveal the war with the Yeerks to their families and evacuate their homes.
Jake's parents are, with Tom's help, captured by the Yeerks and made into Controllers.
Tobias makes contact with his mother and evacuates her to the Free Hork-Bajir colony.
Loren gains the ability to morph.

Morphs

Despite acquiring the German shepherd morph, Marco and Rachel do not morph into it.

Animorphs books
2001 fantasy novels
2001 science fiction novels